Trusted Shops is a company founded in Cologne, Germany in 1999, which offers online shops and their customers trust-building services by means of a trustmark, a money-back guarantee process and a system of customer reviews for money. The Trustbadge costs around 1200€ up to 2000€ per year for an online store. The online store is audited once to get the certificate and then the Online store has to pay around 700€+VAT every year for that same certificate, but no more audits are made. Online retailers are also provided with minor assistance in meeting legal requirements.  Around 25,000 online shops display the trustmark as of July 2019.

Company history

Foundation 
The company was founded in Cologne (Germany) in 1999 as a joint venture between Gerling Speziale Kreditversicherungs AG and the business consultancy Impact Business & Technology Consulting GmbH. Jean-Marc Noël and Ulrich Hafenbradl were among the founders. The company began operations one year later. Its offer consisted of a trustmark for online shops, and from the very beginning the company also offered customers of online shops displaying the trustmark a money-back guarantee.  By mid-November 2000, around 100 shops had obtained the trustmark.

Development

The number of online shops with a trustmark grew in the following years. While there were 9,000 in 2010,  more than 30,000 trusted shops are currently registered (last update October 2021).

In 2009, the company offered interested shops its web-based shopping review tool as a stand-alone version that is independent of the trustmark.

Trusted Shops France SARL was founded in 2017 as a wholly owned subsidiary of Trusted Shops GmbH, and one year later the Polish subsidiary was founded. The Spanish subsidiary was founded in September 2019 and the Dutch subsidiary in October 2019.

Present

Services 
 Online shops are entitled to use the Trusted Shops trustmark after paying a lot of money and passing an audit that includes aspects such as data security that is checked only by reading through the stores terms, consumer protection which is in reality provided by law, customer service, price transparency and creditworthiness.
 The money-back guarantee adds financial security to the promise that online shops with trustmark are trustworthy providers. In reality there have been many issues in realising the money-back guarantee.
 Companies can use web-based feedback systems to have their customers review purchases or transactions. This includes, for example, the service, the website, or the delivered product quality. The system ensures that only customers who have made purchases participate in the feedback procedure. This also all for an extra fee for the online store.
 The legal security aid is offered in cooperation with law firms and includes, among other things, the drafting of legal texts (such as the General Terms and Conditions), checking websites for compliance with e-commerce law, and representation in case of legal disputes in Germany and other European countries.

Personnel and locations 
The company’s headquarters is located in Cologne (Germany). Further locations are in France (Lille), in the Netherlands (Amsterdam), in Poland (Warsaw) and in Spain (Barcelona). According to its own statements, the company employs 500 people.

Owners 
According to the information based on the financial year 2017 provided by Bisnode, two Crédit Agricole funds (CA Innovation 10 and LCL Innovation 2009) jointly own 10% of the shares in Trusted Shops. Two private equity and infrastructure funds owned by French investor Omnes Capital (Capital Invest PME 2014 and Capital Invest PME 2015) jointly hold 4%. Sohano GmbH owns 23% and Entract GmbH owns 38%. 25% is held by Global Founders Capital GmbH & Co (belongs to Rocket Internet).

References

Certification marks

E-commerce
Companies based in Cologne
1999 establishments in Germany